Butler County is the name of eight counties in the United States:

 Butler County, Alabama
 Butler County, Iowa
 Butler County, Kansas
 Butler County, Kentucky
 Butler County, Missouri
 Butler County, Nebraska
 Butler County, Ohio
 Butler County, Pennsylvania